Jorge da Costa Pires (born 1 April 1981) is a Portuguese former professional footballer who played as a striker.

He spent most of his career in LigaPro, totalling 324 matches and a record 113 goals for six teams and being top scorer three times. Additionally, he played 42 Primeira Liga games and scored 11 goals in two spells with Portimonense.

Club career
Born in Amares, Braga District, Pires spent his youth career with FC Amares and S.C. Braga. He made his senior debut with the former in the fourth division before moving into the latter's reserve team in the third. He then had brief lower league spells at C.D. Portosantense, Amares again, A.D. Pontassolense and G.D. Ribeirão.

In 2008, Pires joined F.C. Vizela of the second level and a year later Portimonense SC, whom he helped to promotion as runners-up in his first season and then played in Primeira Liga for the first time, his maiden appearance in the competition occurring on 13 August 2010 in a 1–3 away loss against Braga where he came on as a second-half substitute. After their immediate relegation, he spent the next two years in the second tier with C.D. Aves and C.D. Feirense respectively.

Pires signed for Moreirense F.C. in June 2013, and was the league's top scorer with 22 goals (one more than FC Porto B's Tózé) as his team won promotion to the top flight as champions. In June 2014, he moved abroad to join S.L. Benfica (Luanda). After winning the Taça de Angola, he returned to Portimonense on an 18-month deal in December.

In 2016–17, Pires was again the second division's top scorer with 23 goals as the Algarvean team won the league title, with four more than Gil Vicente FC's Paulinho. He added seven the following campaign in a 10th-place finish, including a hat-trick in a 4–3 win over former club Moreirense on 31 March 2018 in which the opponents had led 3–0; two of those goals were added-time penalties to win the points.

Pires, who had two years remaining on his contract in Portimão, chose from seven offers to go on loan to F.C. Penafiel of the second tier in August 2018. He was again top scorer with 16 goals, joint with Fabrício of F.C. Famalicão, and his permanent transfer was subsequently confirmed.

Pires retired on 20 August 2020 at the age of 39, as the highest scorer of all time in his country's second division. He immediately returned to Portimonense, as part of the coaching setup for the under-23 team.

Honours
Moreirense
Segunda Liga: 2013–14

Portimonense
LigaPro: 2016–17

Benfica Luanda
Taça de Angola: 2014

Individual
LigaPro top scorer: 2013–14, 2016–17, 2018–19 (joint)

References

External links

1981 births
Living people
People from Amares
Sportspeople from Braga District
Portuguese footballers
Association football forwards
Primeira Liga players
Liga Portugal 2 players
Segunda Divisão players
S.C. Braga B players
G.D. Ribeirão players
F.C. Vizela players
Portimonense S.C. players
C.D. Aves players
C.D. Feirense players
Moreirense F.C. players
F.C. Penafiel players
Girabola players
S.L. Benfica (Luanda) players
Portuguese expatriate footballers
Expatriate footballers in Angola
Portuguese expatriate sportspeople in Angola